Project Billboard is a United States non-profit Democratic/progressive political advocacy group that seeks to utilize media outlets, such as outdoor billboard spaces, around the country to raise issues which concern the nation

In the news
In 2004, Project Billboard filed a breach of contract suit against Clear Channel for the rejection by its outdoor advertising division of a billboard ad against the war in Iraq. The ad, intended for a 40-foot billboard Clear Channel manages in Times Square, was to have the slogan, "Democracy is best taught by example, not by war," along with a red, white and blue cartoon image of a bomb. Clear Channel's contract with Project Billboard only allowed the company to reject ads that were illegal or contrary to public morals; Clear Channel claimed that the image of the bomb was insensitive in New York City, the site of the most devastating of the 9/11 terrorist attacks. Project Billboard claimed that Clear Channel's rejection was instead for purely political reasons. Clear Channel settled the suit by agreeing to an alternative featuring an image of a peace dove instead of a bomb.

See also
Clear Channel Communications

External links
Official website

Political advocacy groups in the United States